Nardaran is a settlement and municipality on the Abşeron Peninsula in Baku, Azerbaijan. It has a population of 8,300. Located 25 kilometers northeast of central Baku, it is politically part of the Baku city-subdivision and treated as a suburb. Unlike most of the rest of the country which is religiously liberal, Nardaran is a center of conservative Shi'a Islam and pro-Iranian sentiment in Azerbaijan.

Nardaran's name come from Persian: nar (pomegranate)نار + daran (trees) داران, i.e. "place with pomegranate trees".

The town is the site of a 14th-century castle, featuring a round tower approximately 12.5 meters high. During Soviet rule, the town was known as a center for growing flowers.  Since Azerbaijan's independence, the economy has dwindled and the town is reputed for its caviar poachers.

Center of Shia Islam
Nardaran "has long been a bastion of devout Shia Muslims" and is the only place in the whole of Azerbaijan where its inhabitants are devoutly religious and conservative, and where its streets displayed religious banners and where most women wear chadors in public. The town is home to a madrasa as well as the Rahima Khanim Mosque, a large Shia mosque built in the late 1990s over the tomb of Rahima Khanim, the sister of Imam Reza. The now banned Islamic Party of Azerbaijan was founded in this town and its base was centered there. Nardaran has been the site of strong protests and unrest, notable riots in June 2002 over what protesters deemed inadequate living standards and another in January 2006 which resulted in the deaths of three people. On November 26, 2015, two policemen and four suspected Shia Muslim militants were killed in an armed confrontation.
The religious leader of the Muslim Unity Movement Taleh Bagirov was also arrested, together with 14 other Nardaran residents.

As a result of this incident, the Azerbaijani parliament passed laws prohibiting people with religious education received abroad to implement Islamic rites and ceremonies in Azerbaijan, as well as to preach in mosques and occupy leading positions in the country; as well as prohibiting the display of religious paraphernalia, flags and slogans, except in places of worship, religious centers and offices. Ashura festivities in public have also been banned. The Azerbaijani government also passed a law to remove the citizenship of Azerbaijani citizens who fight abroad.

Gallery

See also
List of lighthouses in Azerbaijan

References

External links
Picture of the lighthouse

Villages in Azerbaijan
Populated places in Baku
Lighthouses in Azerbaijan